Change is the second album released by the Singaporean singer Derrick Hoh. The album was released on 17 December 2010. This record featured 14 tracks, consisting of a prelude/interludes/outro and 10 songs.

Track listing 
 Prelude ~ Change
 說了八百遍
 Interlude ~ Move On
 當我知道你們相愛
 空位
 Baby
 Interlude ~ Future
 愛的故事
 變化
 好好好
 不值得
 Outro ~ The Beginning
 你.我
 Refresh. Rise. Roar. (中文版)

References

2008 albums
Derrick Hoh albums